Frederick C. Aldrich (September 30, 1924 – October 20, 2018) was an American politician. He served as a member of the New Hampshire House of Representatives.

Life and career 
Aldrich attended Lebanon High School and served in the United States Army Air Corps. After his service, he attended Keene State College and the University of Vermont.

In 1975, Aldrich was elected to the New Hampshire House of Representatives.

Aldrich died in October 2018, at the age of 94.

References 

1924 births
2018 deaths
Members of the New Hampshire House of Representatives
New Hampshire Republicans
20th-century American politicians
Keene State College alumni
University of Vermont alumni